Pedro Alves Correia (born 12 October 1999), known as Pedro Martelo, is a Portuguese footballer who plays as a forward (striker) for Os Belenenses

Club career
Born in Évora, Martelo joined S.L. Benfica's youth setup in 2012, after representing Lusitano G.C. On 30 July 2016, he moved abroad and agreed to a four-year contract with Deportivo de La Coruña.

Martelo made his senior debut with the reserves on 16 April 2017, coming on as a late substitute for Pinchi in a 1–0 Tercera División home win against Céltiga FC; it was his only appearance of the campaign, as his side achieved promotion. He was definitely promoted to the B-side in July 2018, but only featured sparingly.

On 31 January 2019, Martelo joined S.C. Braga on a six-month loan deal, and was assigned to the B-team in LigaPro. He made his professional debut on 19 April, replacing Denisson Silva in a 0–1 away loss against Varzim S.C.

On 26 August 2020, Martelo signed a three-year deal with F.C. Paços de Ferreira.

On 31 January 2021, Martelo moved to Spanish side Badajoz on a loan deal.

International career
Martelo was part of the Portugal side that won the 2018 UEFA European Under-19 Championship in Finland. He scored in the first two minutes of a 5–0 semi-final win over Ukraine, and the extra-time winner in the 4–3 final victory over Italy.

Personal life
Martelo's father Juary and his cousin Vítor are also footballers. The former played as a defender while the latter plays as a winger, but both only played amateur football throughout their careers.

Honours
Portugal U19
UEFA European Under-19 Championship: 2018

References

External links

1999 births
Living people
People from Évora
Portuguese footballers
Association football forwards
Liga Portugal 2 players
S.C. Braga B players
F.C. Paços de Ferreira players
Segunda División B players
Tercera División players
Deportivo Fabril players
CD Badajoz players
Portuguese expatriate footballers
Expatriate footballers in Spain
Portuguese expatriate sportspeople in Spain
Portugal youth international footballers
Sportspeople from Évora District